Moonage Daydream is a 2022 documentary film about English singer-songwriter David Bowie. Written, directed, produced and edited by Brett Morgen, the film uses previously unreleased footage from Bowie's personal archives, including live concert footage. It is the first film to be officially authorized by Bowie's estate, and takes its title from the 1972 Bowie song of the same name.

Moonage Daydream had its world premiere at the 2022 Cannes Film Festival, where it received positive reviews. It was released theatrically and in IMAX in the United States on 16 September 2022. It was shortlisted for the 2023 Academy Awards.

Synopsis

The documentary uses a montage-style editing format to convey a biography of Bowie, utilizing film clips and interviews from throughout his career. The film starts with a 2002 quote of Bowie stating:

"At the turn of the 20th century, Friedrich Nietzsche proclaimed that God is dead and that man had killed him."
"This created an arrogance with man that he himself was God. But as God, all he could seem to produce was disaster."
"That led to a terrifying confusion: for if we could not take the place of God, how could we fill the space we had created within ourselves?"

The film is divided into nearly two dozen "chapters" in the DVD release with the first hour covering Bowie starting in London up to his departure to West Berlin. The second part of the film discussed and presents Bowie's extensive interests in the arts while in West Berlin outside of the music industry, such as his interest in oil painting and acrylic painting, as well as his interest in writing within the literary arts. Many examples of Bowie's portrait work in oils are presented showing the use of a modern representational style of portraiture combined with an experimental color palette for brightly lit representations in nearly kaleidoscopic color preferences for facial expressions. In his third phase covered in the last part of the film, Bowie emerges from a two year hiatus where he remakes himself in the image of a suave musical artist often dressed in tailored Saville Row double breasted men's business suits.

The first hour of the film begins with a long film clip of Bowie performing a live version of a largely narrated version of "All the Young Dudes" before singing the choruses later made famous by Mott the Hoople's recording of the song. Bowie is picture in many clips from his glam rock years wearing heavily costumed outfits often experimenting with the signature transgender dressing associated with his early years. Bowie emerges from these pre-Berlin years as a significant rock-and-roll star on the London scene making an impact throughout much of Britain and the United States.

After moving to West Berlin, Bowie speaks in clips and interviews about the extensive impact which the aesthetics of German culture in West Berlin had upon his artistic sensibilities. Bowie is apparently deeply moved by the visual arts as he experiences them while in West Berlin, and this influences his own painting style in his own renderings of oil portraits and related efforts in his other oil paintings. The documentary's film style of montage also interlaces many film clips from over two dozen different films ranging from the silent era including the film Metropolis up to and including clips from the Stanley Kubrick-directed films Clockwork Orange and 2001: A Space Odyssey.

Bowie's third phase is covered by showing him appearing in his tailored Savile Row double breasted business suits and appearing in duets with multiple established artists such as Tina Turner and others. He is depicted as having entered the height of his career and formed a new life style with his new wife Iman Abdulmajid. Bowie dies at the age of 69.

Production
In 2021, Variety reported that Brett Morgen had been developing a film based on David Bowie, "for which an official title has not been disclosed, for the last four years." It is the first film to be officially authorized by Bowie's estate. Working in cooperation with the estate, Morgen was granted access to an archive of five million different items, including paintings, drawings, recordings, photographs, films, and journals. Tony Visconti, who spent years as Bowie's producer, serves as the film's music producer.

Marketing
An official teaser trailer for the film was uploaded to YouTube on 23 May 2022. A full trailer was released on 27 July.

Release
Moonage Daydream had its world premiere at the 2022 Cannes Film Festival on 23 May 2022. It was released in IMAX and theatres in the United States on 16 September 2022. It is also expected to be released for streaming on HBO Max in spring 2023. The documentary was released in DVD format on 15 November 2022.

Soundtrack 

To accompany the film, a soundtrack album containing music of Bowie's used therein was announced on 25 August 2022. An initial digital release was set for 16 September 2022, with a two-disc CD version to follow on 18 November 2022 and a three-disc vinyl record release at an unspecified point in 2023. The music on the album consists of rare or previously unreleased live tracks, as well as newly created remixes, interspersed with monologues from Bowie himself.

Reception

Critical response
On Rotten Tomatoes, the film has an approval rating of 92% based on 150 reviews, with an average rating of 8.2/10. The website's critics' consensus reads: "An audiovisual treat for Bowie fans, Moonage Daydream takes an appropriately distinctive approach to one of modern music's most mercurial artists." On Metacritic, which uses a weighted average, the film has a score of 83 out of 100 based on 34 critic reviews, indicating "universal acclaim".

Owen Gleiberman of Variety wrote that "We've seen trippy documentaries before, but Morgen seems to have created this movie to be rock 'n' roll. [...] Watching Moonage Daydream, there are essential facts you won't hear, and many touchstones that get skipped over (in the entire movie, you'll never even see an album cover). But you get closer than you expect to the chilly sexy enigma of who David Bowie really was." Corey Seymour of Vogue commended the film's editing and soundtrack, and called the film "astounding, bombastic, groundbreaking, electrifying, and among the best films about any artist or musician I've ever seen. [...] Morgen has [assembled] a mesmerizing collage of sound and vision that will entrance and enrich any Bowie fan and, presumably, make new fans of anyone lucky enough to have this be their first real encounter with his world."

Peter Bradshaw, in his review of the film for The Guardian, gave it a score of five out of five stars. He called the film "a glorious celebratory montage", and wrote favourably of how the film "shows that his fans, especially the ecstatic young people at the Hammersmith Odeon and Earl's Court shows, were not different from Bowie: they became Bowie. Overwhelmed, transfigured, their faces looked like his face."  Robert Daniels, writing for RogerEbert.com, praised the film's editing, and called it "a bombastic, overstimulating, poignant, life-affirming, and risk-taking summation of the artist's ethos and maturation as a person. In short, Moonage Daydream is the film Bowie would've proudly made." Fionnuala Halligan of Screen Daily called the film "a pristine sensory voyage, with astonishing sound", and lauded its presentation as "skilled and satisfyingly unconventional".

Entertainment Weeklys Joshua Rothkopf gave the film a grade of "A−", complimenting the remixed music by Tony Visconti and noting that, "Occasionally, Morgen's flow can feel belabored and imprecise, [...] But pruning would hamper the unencumbered risk-taking on display," an approach which Rothkopft writes "instantly vaults the effort to the top of the Bowie docs." Siddhant Adlakha of IndieWire gave the film a "B+", characterizing it thus: "More sensory experience than straightforward recounting, [Moonage Daydream] is about feeling your way through a chaotic world with Ziggy Stardust as your anchor." He concluded that, "As musical documentaries go, it's more ambitious than anything you're likely to witness for quite some time." Paul Sinclair of SuperDeluxeEdition was more critical in his review, praising the film's integration of archival footage, animation, interview audio, and music while criticizing the pacing and length, describing the result as "oddly unmoving" and stating that "the film is at least half an hour too long, a feeling accentuated by the reuse of clips you've already seen on a number of occasions which gives a rather circular, haven't-we-been-here-before vibe to proceedings." Sinclair also criticized a perceived lack of sufficient coverage for certain periods of Bowie's career, singling out his tenure on EMI America Records and his membership in Tin Machine.

Accolades

References

External links
 
 
 
 

2022 documentary films
2022 films
American documentary films
Documentary films about rock music and musicians
Films directed by Brett Morgen
2010s English-language films
2020s American films
Collage film